is a town located in Kusu District, Ōita Prefecture, Japan. As of March 2017, the town has an estimated population of 15,954. The total area is 286.44 km².

Geography

Neighbouring municipalities 

 Ōita Prefecture
 Hita
 Nakatsu
 Usa
 Kokonoe
 Kumamoto Prefecture
 Oguni

Climate
Kusu has a humid subtropical climate (Köppen climate classification Cfa) with hot summers and cool winters. Precipitation is significant throughout the year but is somewhat lower in winter.

Demographics
Per Japanese census data, the population of Kusu in 2020 is 14,386 people. Kusu has been conducting censuses since 1920.

Transportation

Railways 

 JR Kyushu
 Kyūdai Main Line: Sugikawachi - Kita-Yamada - Bungo-Mori

Expressways 

 Ōita Expressway
 Japan National Route 210
 Japan National Route 387

Notable people from Kusu
Seishiro Etō, politician
Kurushima Takehiko, former children's literature author

References

External links

 Kusu official website 

Towns in Ōita Prefecture